This is the list of the proper names for the stars in the constellation Grus. (Used modern western astronomy and uranography only).

List

Etymologies

α Gru 
 Alnair, Al Nair (Al Na'ir):
 ＜ (ar) an-nayyir, "the bright one" ＜ (sci.-ar) al-Nayyir min Dhanab al-ḥūt (al-Janūbiyy), "the Bright (star) belongs to the Tail of (the constellation of) the (Southern) Fish", for this star.

γ Gru 
 Al Dhanab:
 ＜ (ar) al-dhanab, "the tail" ＜ (sci.-ar) al-dhanab al-ḥūt (al-Janūbiyy), "the tail of (the constellation of) the (Southern) Fish", for this star.

θ Gru 
 No Arabic Name Available
 ＜ A fairly large and bright star located west of the constellation Grus. Follows the same paths as many of the other stars in Grus, for example Gamma and Alpha Gruis in history and mythology

See also 
 List of stars in Grus
 List of star names

Notes

References 
 
 
 

Grus (constellation)
Grus